Kokoszki is a district of Gdańsk, Poland, located in the western part of the city.

History

As part of the Crown of the Kingdom of Poland, Kokoszki was a private village of Polish nobility, administratively located in the Gdańsk County in the Pomeranian Voivodeship. Kiełpino Górne and Smęgorzyno which are part of the district had the same status, while Bysewo was a royal village of the Polish Crown.

Camp Danzig-Kokoschken operated from September 13, 1944 with prisoners from Poland, France, Netherlands, Lithuania, Latvia, Germany and Hungary, mostly of Jewish origin. The first transport brought about 500 women. Within several weeks the number grew to 1,600. In the winter of 1945 the Poles imprisoned by the Gestapo office in Danzig were sent in. The prisoners were kept in barracks from where they were transported every day by train to the Schichau-Werke shipyard, to work two 12-hour shifts building submarines and anti-raid shelters. The prisoners received rations of half-a-litre of watery soup and 250 grams of bread per day; not enough to sustain their ability to work. There was no proper clothes in winter. People died in great numbers as a result of epidemics, workplace accidents, and beatings by the guards. Archival material indicate that such treatment was common already at the end of 1944. Dead bodies were burned in a crematorium but also buried in mass graves at the cemetery in Saspe (Zaspa).

See also
 Poland bus disaster of 1994 involving a PKS commuter bus

References

 Map of Kokoszki

Districts of Gdańsk
Holocaust locations in Poland